Xuxa (also referred to as Xuxa 1) is the sixth studio album and the first in the Spanish-language by Brazilian pop singer, TV host and actress Xuxa. It was first released on November 18, 1989, in the Chile and United States by the record company Som Livre, in the Latin America in January 1990, and in August of the same year in Europe.

The album sold more than 1,900,000 copies and reached the fourth position of the Billboard Latin Pop Albums chart. Xuxa 1 features versions of major hits such as "Ilarié", "Danza de Xuxa" and "Arco Iris", and led to Xuxa receiving a nomination for Pop New Artist of the Year at the 1990 Lo Nuestro Awards.

Background 
The Brazilian singer, TV host and actress Xuxa it became popular in Brazil and other Latin American countries. Her music became a part of El Show de Xuxa, and with the success of the song "Ilariê" beyond Brazil, a compilation of songs from her first three Portuguese albums was re-recorded in Spanish.

Xuxa did not speak Spanish and took a language crash course, with special focus on pronunciation, in order to perform the songs for the album in Spanish. Song lyrics (like the names of the characters in the song "Bombom") were changed to keep the rhyme structure in the songs. The music composition was not rewritten but did experience many changes during the re-mix.

The Spanish album brings together Xuxa's most popular songs, including "Ilariê" ("Ilarié"), "Doce Mel" ("Dulce Miel"), "Arco-Íris" ("Arco Iris"), "Dança da Xuxa" ("Danza de Xuxa"), and "Vamos Brincar de Índio" ("Juguemos a Los Indios").

Production 
The album was produced by Michael Sullivan, Paulo Massadas, and Guto Graça Mello, with artistic coordination by Max Pierre and Guto Graça Mello. It was recorded in the studios of Som Livre in Rio de Janeiro.

Release 
The album was first released in Chile and United States on November 18, 1989, by Som Livre and in January 1990 in Argentine, Ecuador,  Mexico, Portugal, Spain, Venezuela and other countries. In Brazil, the album was launched in August 1990 by Som Livre. In each country, the design of the album cover, back cover, and the album booklet was changed to reflect differences in the song lyrics or data sheet. In some versions, a text on the cover of the album indicated the correct pronunciation of the name of the artist: "Shu-sha".

Commercial performance
Xuxa reached number 4 in the Billboard Latin Pop Albums chart, The album reached 1.2 million copies sold in March 1991. By September of the same year the album had sold more than 2 million copies in ten countries.

Promotion
Beginning the release of the album, on November 18, Xuxa participated in the congress of the Organización de Telecomunicaciones de Iberoamérica (OTI) in Miami (USA). In the marathon of divulging in the country, the singer realized some shows and gave interviews for radios and TV programs. There he received proposals to take his next tour to Latin American countries.

On February 22, 1990, it was the turn to perform at the Viña del Mar International Song Festival in Chile. Xuxa won the top prize of the event and was invited to perform again the next day due to the animation she caused in the audience.

With the release of the album in Europe in October 1990, the Queen of Baixinhos recorded special appearances on TV shows in Spain and Italy, as well as having performed on some of the major Spanish radio stations.

On November 19, in addition to presenting the category of best children's TV program at the Emmy Awards in the US, the presenter sang the single "Danza de Xuxa".

In December, the singer won a special in Argentina shown by Telefé, where she sang some songs from the album.

Throughout 1990, Xuxa participated of programs of TV and radio of diverse Latin countries like Mexico and Uruguay. The Xuxa 90 tour went through Paraguay and Chile with the repertoire changed.

Track listing

Personnel

Produced: Michael Sullivan, Paulo Massadas and Guto Graça Mello
Xuxa's Spanish voice direction: Graciela Carballo
Recording and mixing technician: Jorge "Gordo" Guimarães
Studio Assistants Mix: Loba and Marcio Barros
Recorded at the studios: Som Livre - Rio de Janeiro - Brazil
Cover: Reinaldo Waisman
Photography: José Antonio (cover) and André Wanderley (back cover)
Artistic Coordination: Max Pierre and Guto Graça Mello
Technicians (Free Sound): Edu, Luiz Paulo, D Orey, Mario Jorge, Beto Vaz and Celio Martins
Technicians (Studio Mix): Andy Mills, João Damasceno and Paulo Henrique
Recording and mixing: Jackson Paulino, Marcelo Serodio, Beto Vaz, Cezar Barosa, Sergio Ricardo, Billy, Julinho Martin

Chart positions

Certifications

Release history

References

External links 
 Xuxa 1 at Discogs

1989 albums
Xuxa albums
Spanish-language albums
Children's music albums by Brazilian artists